Discovery Bay is one of the 10 constituencies in the Islands District in Hong Kong.

The constituency returns one district councillor to the Islands District Council, with an election every four years.

Discovery Bay constituency has an estimated population of 20,016.

Councillors represented

Election results

2010s

References

Discovery Bay
Constituencies of Hong Kong
Constituencies of Islands District Council
1991 establishments in Hong Kong
Constituencies established in 1991